The Texas ratio is a measure of a bank's credit troubles.  The higher the Texas ratio, the more severe the credit troubles.

Developed by Gerard Cassidy and others at RBC Capital Markets, it is calculated by dividing the value of the lender's non-performing assets (NPL + Real Estate Owned) by the sum of its tangible common equity capital and loan loss reserves.

In analyzing Texas banks during the early 1980s recession, Cassidy noted that banks tended to fail when this ratio reached 1:1, or 100%. He noted a similar pattern among New England banks during the recession of the early 1990s.

References

External links 

 Current Texas Ratios for all US Banks and Credit Unions
 Current Texas Ratios for US Banks Updated May 21st 2010 by Amateur Investors
 Complete list of US banks and their Texas ratios as published in December of 2008 and an updated listing published in October of 2009; the original blog entry includes notes how the tables were created (that the ratio was multiplied by 100 for easier comprehension, etc.)

Banking
Credit
Debt
Financial ratios